The British India Society was a society concerned about ethical practice in India. It was founded in 1839, and from 1843 had a branch society in Bengal.

Not to be confused with the India Society.

About the Society
The British India Society was founded in 1839 by British and American abolitionists, East India Company (EIC) men, private traders and members of the Bengali elite. This relatively short-lived organisation argued that, if properly managed, India’s ‘fertile soil and willing sons’ could provide an ethical source of sugar, cotton and other tropical goods that would undercut slavery in the American South. This anti-slavery agenda was combined with an attack on EIC misrule and the promotion of private enterprise in India."

Founders
William Adam, after visiting Raja Ram Mohan Roy in India, returned to England, and formed the Society with George Thompson (abolitionist), William Ednis, and Major General Briggs, to organise meetings and create awareness of conditions in India.

Publications
The Society issued a newspaper British Indian Advocate from 1841.

References

External links
 Peaceful, Bloodless and Anti-Slavery Commerce? The British India Society and the Ethics of East India Trade, 1833-1857 - British Academy Research Project, led by Prof Andrea Major (Leeds University)

1839 establishments in the United Kingdom